Pentaloncha is a genus of flowering plants belonging to the family Rubiaceae.

Its native range is Western Central Tropical Africa.

Species
Species:
 Pentaloncha humilis Hook.f.

References

Rubiaceae
Rubiaceae genera